Platynereis festiva is a species of annelid in the family Nereididae. It was originally described in the genus Nereis and later reassigned to the genus Platynereis.

References 

Phyllodocida
Animals described in 1874